Peter Szczepaniak (born 22 October 1991) is a Slovak footballer who plays as midfielder who currently plays for MŠK Tisovec.

Career

FO ŽP Šport Podbrezová
Szczepaniak made his professional debut for FO ŽP Šport Podbrezová against FK Senica on 26 November 2016.

References

External links
 FO ŽP Šport Podbrezová official club profile
   
 Futbalnet Profile
 Eurofotbal Profile

1991 births
Living people
Slovak footballers
Association football midfielders
FK Železiarne Podbrezová players
FK Dukla Banská Bystrica players
Slovak Super Liga players
Cymru Premier players
Expatriate footballers in Wales
Sportspeople from Brezno
Undy A.F.C. players